Zubin Minoo Bharucha (born 8 January 1970) is an Indian former first-class cricketer who played for Bombay and Surrey County Cricket Club. He worked as the team director of Rajasthan Royals from 2008 to 2015, and is working as director of cricket of the team since 2018.

Life and career
A right-handed opening batsman, Bharucha first played as an overseas player for the Reigate Priory Cricket Club in England as an 18-year-old and represented the club for several years. He appeared in 17 first-class and 11 List A matches, playing for Bombay, and scored a hundred on his first-class debut in November 1992. He was part of the Bombay team in its 1993–94 Ranji Trophy victory. In the 1994–95 Irani Cup match for Bombay against Rest of India, Bharucha scored his career-best unbeaten 164 and helped his team win the trophy. He also represented India Youth XI and Surrey.

Bharucha runs the World Cricket Academy in Mumbai where many Test cricketers have trained. In 2008, he became the team director of the Indian Premier League franchise Rajasthan Royals and continued in that position until the team's suspension in 2015. He also worked as the team's head coach in 2012. During his stint with the Royals, he made technical analysis of players based on video footage collected from around the world, and scouted for talented Indian cricketers. He helped Yuvraj Singh on his footwork in the late-2000s and worked with the England and Wales Cricket Board on technical aspects of the game.

References

External links 
 
 

1970 births
Living people
Indian cricketers
Mumbai cricketers
Surrey cricketers
Indian cricket coaches
Indian Premier League coaches
Cricketers from Mumbai
Parsi people from Mumbai
Parsi people